The 1936–37 season in Swedish football, starting August 1936 and ending July 1937:

Honours

Official titles

Competitions

Promotions, relegations and qualifications

Promotions

League transfers

Relegations

Domestic results

Allsvenskan 1936–37

Allsvenskan promotion play-off 1936–37

Division 2 Norra 1936–37

Division 2 Östra 1936–37

Division 2 Västra 1936–37

Division 2 Södra 1936–37

Division 2 promotion play-off 1936–37

Norrländska Mästerskapet 1937 
Final

National team results 

 Sweden: 

 Sweden: 

 Sweden: 

 Sweden: 

 Sweden: 

 Sweden: 

 Sweden:

National team players in season 1936–37

Notes

References 
Print

Online

 
Seasons in Swedish football